Clare Exelby (born November 5, 1938) was a Canadian football player who played for the Calgary Stampeders, Toronto Argonauts and Montreal Alouettes. Exelby's son, Randy Exelby, is a former NHL player and grandson, Kyle Capobianco, currently plays for the Arizona Coyotes.

References

1938 births
Living people
Canadian football people from Toronto
Players of Canadian football from Ontario
Toronto Argonauts players
Montreal Alouettes players
Calgary Stampeders players